Guldstaden IB  was a floorball club in Skellefteå, Sweden. The men's team played 9 seasons in the Swedish top division, starting in 1989/1990. During the 1991/1992 season the team reached the Swedish national championship quarterfinals, losing to IBK Lockerud, and the upcoming season the same thing happened again, but against Balrog IK.

References

Sport in Skellefteå
Swedish floorball teams